Callum James Cooke (born 21 February 1997) is an English professional footballer who plays as an attacking midfielder for League Two club Hartlepool United.

Career

Middlesbrough
Cooke began his career with Middlesbrough's Academy and he signed a professional contract with the club in June 2014. He played for Middlesbrough U23s in two EFL Trophy ties in 2016, scoring one goal.

In January 2017 Cooke joined League Two side Crewe Alexandra on loan. He made his professional debut on 4 February 2017 in a 4–0 defeat away at Exeter City, then scored on his home debut in a 5–0 win over Grimsby Town on 11 February. On 9 May 2017, Crewe announced that Cooke would be returning to his parent club.

On 18 July 2017, Cooke joined League One club Blackpool on loan until the end of the season.

Peterborough United
On 30 July 2018, Cooke signed for League One side Peterborough United on a two-year deal for an undisclosed fee.

He was transfer-listed by Peterborough United at the end of the 2018–19 season. He moved on loan to Bradford City in August 2019 for the 2019–20 season. His loan expired on 1 May 2020.

Bradford City
He returned to Bradford City in July 2020, signing a permanent two-year contract. Cooke was released by the club at the end of the 2021–22 season.

Hartlepool United
In July 2022, following his departure from Bradford, Cooke decided to join League Two side Hartlepool United. In November 2022, Cooke scored his first Hartlepool goal in a 3–1 win against Harrogate Town in the FA Cup. He scored his first league goal on Boxing Day in 2022 which was a late 25-yard free kick in a 2–1 win at Rochdale.

Career statistics

References

External links

England profile at The Football Association

1997 births
Living people
People from Peterlee
Footballers from County Durham
English footballers
English Football League players
Middlesbrough F.C. players
Crewe Alexandra F.C. players
Blackpool F.C. players
Peterborough United F.C. players
Association football midfielders
Bradford City A.F.C. players
Hartlepool United F.C. players